Back from the Dead is an album by the heavy metal band Spinal Tap. Released on June 16, 2009, it is the first release under the Spinal Tap name since 1992's Break Like the Wind.

Concept and music
The concept of Back from the Dead is that Spın̈al Tap has reunited in honor of the 25th anniversary of This Is Spinal Tap, and have launched an "unwigged and unplugged" tour.

Back from the Dead features re-recorded versions of songs featured in This Is Spın̈al Tap and its soundtrack album, and five songs not previously available on an album: "Warmer Than Hell", "Short and Sweet", "Celtic Blues", "Rock 'n' Roll Nightmare", and "Back from the Dead". "Jazz Oddyssey", which appeared briefly during the film, appears in three parts within Back from the Dead. "Sex Farm" appears in a funk-oriented version, while "(Listen to the) Flower People" appears in a reggae-oriented version.

Back from the Dead features guest appearances by Phil Collen, Keith Emerson, John Mayer and Steve Vai.

Packaging and artwork
The CD/DVD version of the album featured a card stock foldout from which a diorama of a "stage" could be assembled with cut outs of all three band members depicted as action figures. A representation of the famed model of Stonehenge sat in the middle, flanked by images of the upraised hands of concertgoers. The band members demonstrated the packaging during an appearance on The Tonight Show with Conan O'Brien.

Release and reception

Back from the Dead was released on June 16, 2009. The album is packaged with a DVD featuring commentary on each of the album's tracks. Preceding the album's release, it was streamed for free by Entertainment Weekly and Spinner. An exclusive version of Back from the Dead was made available through Amazon MP3, featuring a newly recorded version of "(Listen to the) Flower People" in its original style. An additional track, "Saucy Jack", was released through the official Spın̈al Tap website. Fifteen of the songs have been released as downloadable content for the Rock Band video game series, along with "Short and Sweet" appearing as a packaged song in Lego Rock Band.

While Allmusic reviewer Stephen Thomas Erlewine felt that the straightforward approach of the re-recorded songs hurt the remakes, which "pale next to the originals", he wrote that the new songs are "top-notch, eclipsing the often forced Break Like the Wind, and striking the right balance between parody and real rock & roll. They're the reason to hear Back from the Dead, which otherwise is just a tad too satisfied with its own humor for its own good." Back from the Dead was nominated for Best Comedy Album for the 52nd Grammy Awards.

Track listing

Personnel
Spinal Tap
Derek Smalls (Harry Shearer) – bass guitar, vocals
David St. Hubbins (Michael McKean) – lead vocals, guitar
Nigel Tufnel (Christopher Guest) – lead guitar, vocals

Additional musicians
Gregg Bissonette (Gregg Bissonette) – drums
"Caucasian" Jeffrey Vanston (C. J. Vanston) – keyboards
Keith Emerson – keyboards on "Heavy Duty"

Charts

Notes

References

2009 albums
Spinal Tap (band) albums